Shaddai may refer to:

 Possibly the Amorite name of an ancient city in Syria, see Tell eth-Thadeyn
 A term for the God of the Bible, sometimes in the form El Shaddai
 Shaddai (leafhopper), an insect genus in the tribe Alebrini